Escape from New York: Original Motion Picture Soundtrack is a soundtrack album composed and performed by John Carpenter, featuring the score to the 1981 film Escape from New York.

Recording
Sound designer Alan Howarth was introduced to John Carpenter by the picture editor of the film, Todd Ramsay, who had worked with Howarth on Star Trek: The Motion Picture. Howarth used equipment including ARP and Prophet-5 synthesizers and a Linn LM-1 drum machine, as well as an acoustic piano and Fender guitars, to create the palette of sounds used in the score, while Carpenter composed the melodies on the synthesizer keyboards. As the MIDI standard had yet to be invented, Howarth manually synchronized the equipment to picture while listening to a copy of the film's dialogue. Initial inspirational directions which Carpenter shared with Howarth included albums by Tangerine Dream and The Police.

Release
The original release included a contractual obligation to provide a written musical score, which Howarth manually transcribed after recording was completed. The soundtrack was released in 1981 through Varèse Sarabande (originally on vinyl, then CD in 1982); a remastered and remixed edition was reissued in 2000 through Silva Screen Records, containing an extra fifteen tracks not included on the original version (eight of them being short extracts of dialogue from the film), as well as expanded liner notes.

Track listing

2000 remastered edition

Personnel
John Carpenter – keyboard, synthesizer, production
Alan Howarth – synthesizer, sequencing, programming, production
Tommy Lee Wallace – guitar
Pamela Smith – keyboard

References

External links
Escape from New York Soundtrack at The Official John Carpenter
 How the Escape From New York music was made (feat. Alan Howarth)

John Carpenter soundtracks
1981 soundtrack albums
Film scores
Varèse Sarabande soundtracks
Snake Plissken Chronicles
Silva Screen Records soundtracks
Science fiction film soundtracks
Action film soundtracks